Citibank Philippines is the Philippines branch of Citibank. In July 1902, the International Banking Corporation, a predecessor to Citibank, opened its first branch in Manila. Currently, it is the largest commercial bank in the Philippines.

One of its largest investments in the country is the site building in Bonifacio Global City, Taguig.

Citigroup Philippines has 4,200 employees and 3 branches in Metro Manila and Metro Cebu.

History

In 2008, Citibank began offering mobile phone banking. Two-way SMS is Citibank’s latest mobile phone-based service. It allows cardholders to send Citi a text message inquiring about their available credit balance, amount due and payment due date. It also allows users to order food, flowers, mobile recharges through and can order prepaid Internet load (from Blast) SMS. Cardholders can also pay their bills for Globe postpaid plans. Citibank are the first to offer this service on a credit card.

Citibank Philippines also provides its clients with the usual facilities of bank loans, credit cards, deposit accounts, wealth management schemes, and investment options.

In 2012, the bank installed an ATM in The Rockwell Center in Manila which dispenses US Dollars in addition to Pesos- becoming the first in the country to do so. This allows customers to withdraw cash or conduct transactions up to $3000 per day.

Exit Philippine consumer banking operations and Merger with UnionBank 

In April 2021, Citigroup announced it would exit its consumer and retail banking operations in 13 markets, including Australia, Bahrain, China, India, Indonesia, South Korea, Malaysia, the Philippines, Poland, Russia, Taiwan, Thailand and Vietnam. However, Citibank Philippines continued its operations until the sale of the bank to the new local owners.

On December 23, 2021, Citigroup announced that Citigroup sold the company's consumer and retail banking business in the Philippines to Union Bank of the Philippines (UBP) for ₱ 55 billion, with the former as the surviving entity of the said merger. The transaction included the bank’s credit card, personal loans, wealth management, and retail deposit businesses. The acquisition also included the bank’s real estate assets in Citibank Square in Eastwood, Quezon City, Metro Manila as well as three full service Citibank Philippines branches, five wealth centers and two bank branch lites. The deal also means UnionBank would absorb approximately Citibank Philippines' 1,750 local employees, including those in senior management roles, the deal is expected to close in the second half of 2022.

Products and services
Citibank Philippines provides its clients with bank loans, credit cards, deposit accounts, wealth management schemes, and investment options.

References

External links

Citibank Philippines website

Citigroup
Banks of the Philippines
Banks established in 1902
Companies based in Quezon City
1902 establishments in the Philippines
Philippine subsidiaries of foreign companies